Rodrigo Luján De Brito (born January 20, 1992 in Buenos Aires) is an Argentinian professional football player, who plays as a defender.

Club career

Santa Tecla
In 2015 de Brito signed with Santa Tecla. With Santa Tecla de Brito won the Clausura 2015 final against Isidro Metapán on penalties.

Luis Ángel Firpo
For the Clausura 2018 tournament de Brito signed with C.D. Luis Ángel Firpo. However, with the team of Usulután de Brito experienced a serious institutional, economic and sports crisis. The severe delay in salary payments led him to leave the team in the Apertura 2018 tournament, after a 2–1 victory against C.D. Pasaquina in the Sergio Torres Stadium.

Honours

Club 
Santa Tecla F.C.
 Primera División
 Champion: Clausura 2015

References

1992 births
Living people
Argentine footballers
Argentine expatriate footballers
Association football forwards
Expatriate footballers in El Salvador
Santa Tecla F.C. footballers
Footballers from Buenos Aires